Kala Wewa (Sinhala:කලා වැව) built by the King Datusena in 460 A.D, is a twin reservoir complex (Kala Wewa & Balalu Wewa) which has a capacity of 123 million cubic meters. This reservoir complex has facilitated with a stone made spillway and three main sluices.

History
This reservoir was built by the King Dhathusena who ruled the country during 454 – 473 CE in the 5th century.

Tamil invaders who arrived from South India ruled the north part of the country during the period from 429 to 455 AD. King Dhathusena defeated the invaders and united the country and then he wanted to rebuild the irrigation system by constructing several tanks, canals, etc., in and round the kingdom of Anuradhapura.

After completion of construction of Kala Wewa, the king built another tank called  nearby and connected the two tanks together making the biggest tank in Sri Lanka.King Mahinda II who ruled the country during 777 – 797 CE expanded the tank further.

Legends
King Dhathusena was very keen on information with regard to a spot very suitable to construct a tank to be the massive one in the history of Sri Lanka. There are some folklore on how the king was able to find a place for the tank he imagined. There was a man called  who left his family and went to live in the jungle due to his wife's unbearable and repeated insults and disrespects towards him. After some years in the jungle he was well accustomed with wild animals and lived with a flock of deer. One day a hunter suddenly noticed this strange man living with animals in the jungle; went to the palace and told the king that it seems that this strange man lives in the forest in order to guard an unknown treasure there. King sent his army to catch him.  was caught and brought to the palace.  When the king questioned him of the treasure,  revealed his true story and told real reason for his leaving the city and living in the jungle.  Then king asked him of any interesting thing he had seen while living in the jungle.  said, "No sir, I have not seen anything interesting but in a brook somewhere in the jungle, water is being blocked by the flora called  that has been grown across that stream.  According to this legend, it was the spot wherein the king created the Kala Wewa.

Renovation
First restoration to the tank is done by King Parakramabahu I in the 12th century. The tank was renovated several times in the past as in the period of British Governor Sir William Henry Gregory (1872–1877  
and Sir Arthur Hamilton-Gordon (1883–1890). After the British rule in the country and in 1958, the tank's bund was reconstructed connecting the tank with Balalu Wewa.

Size

Attraction
There is a 12 meter high standing statue of Buddha created by same ruler.  This statue is named after the village it is  situated so it is called Avukana Buddha statue and it can be seen over-looking at the tank near by.

Purpose
The reservoir served as one of largest irrigation tanks in ancient time.  While supplying water also for the small tanks in rural areas on the way, the canal Jaya Ganga carried water from Kala Wewa and stored enough water in the Thisā Wewa for the population of then capital city of Anuradhapura.well 

Being one of main storages in the Mahaweli Irrigation Scheme since 1976, the tank serves to the population in the North Central Sri Lanka.  It is used for fresh water fishing and the flora, specially the grasses in its valley, is the main sources of silage for the herds of cattle in the area.

Route

See also
 Dhatusena of Anuradhapura
 Yodha Ela (Jaya Ganga)

References

Bodies of water of Anuradhapura District
Reservoirs in Sri Lanka
Lakes of Sri Lanka